Thomas Ashley Sullivan (March 5, 1950 – October 10, 2002) was a professional American football running back with two National Football League teams.

College football career
Sullivan was a running back with Miami (FL) from 1969–1971.

1969: 79 carries for 319 yards. 9 catches for 86 yards.
1970: 156 carries for 461 yards. 9 catches for 48 yards.
1971: 150 carries for 761 yards and 2 TD. 18 catches for 198 yards.

NFL career
His best success came with the Philadelphia Eagles. In his second year with the team, Sullivan surpassed the 900 yard rushing yard mark and in his third year he led the NFL in rushing touchdowns. Sullivan made news when his first wife, from whom he separated but never divorced, and second wife both claimed his pension. He died in a car accident in 2002.

References

1950 births
Players of American football from Jacksonville, Florida
American football running backs
Miami Hurricanes football players
Philadelphia Eagles players
Cleveland Browns players
2002 deaths
Road incident deaths in South Carolina